St Canice, also called Irishtown, was a constituency represented in the Irish House of Commons from the 1661 until 1800. Irishtown was a borough within the parish of St Canice in the county of the city of Kilkenny. The borough was separate from the city itself, which was represented by Kilkenny City constituency.

The borough was disfranchised by the Acts of Union 1800. Compensation for the loss of the patronage was awarded in the standard amount of £15,000. The claim of Hugh Hamilton, Bishop of Ossory to this compensation was disallowed; instead it went to the Commissioners of First Fruits.

Members of Parliament

1661–1801

References
 
 

Constituencies of the Parliament of Ireland (pre-1801)
Historic constituencies in County Kilkenny
1661 establishments in Ireland
1800 disestablishments in Ireland
Constituencies established in 1661
Constituencies disestablished in 1800